Nicolae Nițu (born 14 October 1969) is a Romanian weightlifter. He competed in the men's middleweight event at the 1992 Summer Olympics.

References

External links
 

1969 births
Living people
Romanian male weightlifters
Olympic weightlifters of Romania
Weightlifters at the 1992 Summer Olympics
Sportspeople from Bucharest
20th-century Romanian people
21st-century Romanian people